"Open Your Heart" is a power ballad released by the Swedish heavy metal band Europe. It was released twice; in 1984 as a single from the album Wings of Tomorrow, and in 1988 as a single from the album Out of This World. The music video for the 1988 release was directed by Jean Pellerin and Doug Freel and shot in London, England.

The lyrics are nearly identical in both these versions, except for one verse:

1984: "Oh girl, before I fall... Maybe the sun will continue to shine, maybe the rain will continue to fall, maybe you want to leave me behind, maybe  you'll change and give me a call."

1988: "Before we lose it all... Maybe the time has its own way of healing, maybe it dries the tears in your eyes, but never change the way that I'm feeling, only you can answer my cries."

Personnel

1984 version
Joey Tempest − vocal, acoustic guitar and keyboards
John Norum − electric guitar
John Levén − bass
Tony Reno − drums

1988 version
Joey Tempest − vocals
Kee Marcello − lead guitar
John Levén − bass
Mic Michaeli − keyboards
Ian Haugland − drums

Charts
Belgium 1988 #31 

NL 1988 #42 

France 1988 #67 

UK 1988 #86

References

1984 singles
1988 singles
Europe (band) songs
Glam metal ballads
Song recordings produced by Ron Nevison
Songs written by Joey Tempest
1984 songs
Epic Records singles